Germán Durán (born August 3, 1984) is a Mexican-American former professional baseball infielder. He played in Major League Baseball (MLB) for the Texas Rangers.

Early life
Durán grew up in Fort Worth, Texas, where he attended Paschal High School and then briefly Texas Christian University. After playing one season at TCU, he transferred to Weatherford College.

Baseball career
Duran was called up from Triple-A Oklahoma in April 2008 to replace an injured Hank Blalock. On April 17, Durán made his major league debut against the Toronto Blue Jays and struck out all three times in his three at bats. He hit his first home run on May 4, 2008 versus the Oakland Athletics. Duran was placed on waivers by the Rangers on June 26, 2009, and was claimed by the Houston Astros on July 1, 2009. German Duran played in the Mexican Baseball league in 2011 before joining the Grand Prairie AirHogs of the American Association. Hitting .317 in 12 games near the end of the season, Duran then hit .536 with 10 RBI in the playoffs, including a home run in game five of the championship series as the AirHogs won the championship over the St. Paul Saints. In December, the AirHogs sold his contract to the Miami Marlins.

On January 25, 2012, Duran signed a minor league contract with the Miami Marlins. He also received an invitation to spring training.

External links

1984 births
Living people
Bakersfield Blaze players
Corpus Christi Hooks players
Fort Worth Cats players
Frisco RoughRiders players
Grand Prairie AirHogs players
Gulf Coast Astros players
Jacksonville Suns players
Leones de Yucatán players
Major League Baseball players from Mexico
Major League Baseball third basemen
Mexican expatriate baseball players in the United States
Mexican League baseball third basemen
Oklahoma City RedHawks players
Oklahoma RedHawks players
Round Rock Express players
Spokane Indians players
Sportspeople from Zacatecas
TCU Horned Frogs baseball players
Texas Rangers players
Weatherford Coyotes baseball players